Misal (Marathi: मिसळ [misəɭ], meaning "mixture"), is a very popular spicy dish in the Western Indian state of Maharashtra. The dish is mostly eaten for breakfast or as a midday snack or sometimes as a one-dish meal, often as part of misal pav. It remains a favourite snack since it is easy to make with affordable ingredients and has a good nutritional value. The taste of misal ranges from mildly to extremely spicy. And there are a lot of varieties as well. Misal is also a popular street food. The dish is always served hot.

The dish originates from the boundary of Khandesh and Western Maharashtra.  Present day Nasik and Ahmednagar districts of Maharashtra.

Ingredients 
The ingredients of misal vary widely, and consist of a combination of the following:
 Usal, a curry made from matki (moth bean) or watane (dried pea) or even mung beans.
 Tarri/kat/sample/rassa, a spicy gravy. This is the heart of the dish and is usually made in many variants identified by colour as "kala rassa" (black), "laal rassa"(red), "hirwa rassa"(green) etc., with the most famous one being tambda-pandhra rassa. The colour of the tarri is imparted by the ingredients used and not by artificial edible food colouring agents. So a green tarri would be made from green chilies and corriander whereas the black tarri would be made from dry roasted bay-leaf and black pepper as main ingredients. The red tarri as expected would have red-chilli powder.
  Batata Bhaji (boiled, diced potatoes, spiced with turmeric, chilies, ginger & mustard).
 Curd called dahi in Marathi (optional)
 Chivda (jaad poha chivda)
 Farsan (not required if Chivda is used)
 Garnish of onions, tomatoes, coriander, lemon wedge
 Pav (Slice or Laadi)

The ingredients are arranged in multiple tier fashion and served.
 The first ingredient to be served is matki or moth bean usal. Usal is sprouted beans cooked with tomatoes and onions. The nutritional value comes from the sprouted beans.
 The second layer is Batata bhaaji spread thin over the usal
 The third layer is Chivda also spread thin over the Batata Bhaaji.
 The fourth layer is a mixture of Onions, tomatoes, coriander and thin Sev.
 Tarri or Kat is added to fill up the bowl (more Tarri is served in a separate bowl)
 Misal is served with sliced bread or a small loaf, in the dish misal-pav.

Variants 
 There is a variant called "upwaas misal" which can also be eaten in case a person is on a religious fast, typically ganesh chaturthi. It contains food items made from potato, sabudana, peanuts etc.
 Mamledar Misal is in Thane City and is usually more spicy.
 Puneri Misal is another version which contains pohe.
 Katakirr, Masti Misal, Chulivarchi Misal, Bedekar, Shri Krishna and Shree Upahar Gruh are amongst the more popular restaurants serving Misal in Pune 
 The Kolhapuri version of misal is usually spicy and does not contain pohe and is served with thick slices of bread, not pav. Phadtare misal is famous in Kolhapur.
 In the Nasik region, misal is mostly served with a fried papad.
 Dahi misal is also one of the widely eaten forms, where curd  is added to balance the spicy taste.
 Jain misal is another new variant in the misal industry, which does not contain any onion or garlic. Even the matki used is not sprouted, but just soaked. 'masti misal' in Pune is famous for its Jain misal.

References

Maharashtrian cuisine
Vegetarian dishes of India